Boris Kharalampiev (born 8 February 1908, date of death unknown) was a Bulgarian long-distance runner. He competed in the marathon at the 1936 Summer Olympics.

References

1908 births
Year of death missing
Athletes (track and field) at the 1936 Summer Olympics
Bulgarian male long-distance runners
Bulgarian male marathon runners
Olympic athletes of Bulgaria
Place of birth missing